Vaucheria litorea is a species of yellow-green algae (Xanthophyceae). It grows in a filamentous fashion (forming long tubular cells connected end to end).  V. litorea is a common intertidal species of coastal brackish waters and salt marshes of the Northern Atlantic, along the coasts of Europe and North America.  It is also found in the Eastern Pacific coasts of Washington state. It is found to be able to tolerate a large range of salinities, making it euryhaline.

Like most algae, V. litorea obtains its energy through photosynthesis taking place in chloroplasts. The chloroplasts of V. litorea contain the photosynthetic pigments Chlorophyll a, Chlorophyll c, β-Carotene, and the carotenoid diadinoxanthin.

Vaucheria litorea are consumed by the sea slug Elysia chlorotica, but are only partially digested by them in order to retain the photosynthetic chloroplasts in a process called kleptoplasty. The sea slug feeds on V. litorea, retaining the chloroplasts in storage in cells along the slug's digestive tract.  The chloroplasts continue to photosynthesize, providing energy to the slug, and contribute to the unusual coloration of the sea slug by their distribution throughout the extensively branched gut.

References

Xanthophyceae
Taxa named by Jacob Georg Agardh
Plants described in 1823